Lilian Martin-Leake (17 March 1867, Paddington, England – 1962, Bideford, England) was a British astronomer, science teacher and scientific illustrator, and a member of British Astronomical Association (BAA). She joined an expedition organized by the Association to observe the total eclipse of May 28, 1900. Along with four other members she was stationed on the roof of the Hotel de la Régence in Algiers to examine the structure of the corona through a 3” (75mm) aperture telescope. Lilian joined the Association on 31 May 1893 at the proposal of Alice Everett and seconded by A S D Russell.

Martin-Leake made a drawing from a telescopic view of prominences and chromosphere during the eclipse of May 28, 1900. Her drawing of the chromosphere and the corona showed red spicules in the chromosphere that were considered as mountains before.



Life 
Lilian Martin-Leake was born on 17 March 1867 in the family of William Martin-Leake - civil engineer and coffee planter and Louisa Harriet (Tennant) Martin-Leake. She had seven siblings - five sisters and two brothers. She matriculated to Girton College Cambridge in 1886 and graduated from there in 1890. Annie Russell and Alice Everett, her proposers for the BAA, attended the same college, graduating a year earlier.

From 1896 to 1900 she was the Science Mistress at Winchester High School. From 1914 to 1915 and again from 1919 to 1928 she was an occasional inspector for the Board of Education.

References 

1867 births
1962 deaths
20th-century British astronomers
Women astronomers
19th-century British astronomers
19th-century British women scientists